Best Friends is a 1975 American drama film directed by Noel Nosseck and starring Doug Chapin (who also wrote a part of the screenplay's dialogue) and Richard Hatch. The film centers on the slow psychotic deterioration of a Vietnam war veteran who aims to restore his carefree youth by eliminating his best friend's marital engagement.

Plot

Cast
 Richard Hatch
 Susanne Benton
 Doug Cahpin

External links
 

1975 films
1975 drama films
Crown International Pictures films
American road movies
Teensploitation
1970s English-language films
Films directed by Noel Nosseck
1970s American films